Thomas Peebles may refer to:

 Thomas Peebles (glazier), Scottish craftsman who worked for the royal palaces
 Thomas Peebles (American football) (1857–1938), first college football head coach for the University of Minnesota in 1883
 Thomas C. Peebles (1921–2010), American physician